Matthew Berry Paterson (19 March 1888 – 1974) was a Scottish professional footballer who played as a centre half, most notably for Hibernian. He made over 410 Scottish League appearances, played in the 1914 Scottish Cup Final, captained the club and was one of its longest-serving players.

Personal life 
Paterson served in the Royal Artillery during the First World War.

Career statistics

References

1888 births
Scottish footballers
Scottish Football League players
Royal Artillery personnel
1974 deaths
Date of death unknown
Hibernian F.C. players
British Army personnel of World War I
Bellshill Athletic F.C. players
Scottish Junior Football Association players
Footballers from South Lanarkshire
St Bernard's F.C. players
Association football wing halves
People from Douglas, South Lanarkshire
Military personnel from Lanarkshire